Felix Chindungwe (born September 9, 1982) is a Zimbabwean professional footballer who plays as a defender for Hwange F.C.

International career
In January 2014, coach Ian Gorowa invited him to be a part of the Zimbabwe squad for the 2014 African Nations Championship. He helped the team to a fourth-place finish after being defeated by Nigeria by a goal to nil.

References

External links

1982 births
Living people
Zimbabwean footballers
Zimbabwe A' international footballers
2014 African Nations Championship players
Chicken Inn F.C. players
Highlanders F.C. players
Hwange Colliery F.C. players
Association football defenders
Zimbabwe international footballers